Atte Mikael Johannes Pakkanen (13 November 1912, in Urjala – 22 December 1994) was a Finnish politician. He was Minister of Defence from 27 May to 1 September 1957 and Minister of the Interior from 29 August 1958 to 12 January 1959. He was a Member of the Parliament of Finland from 1948 to 1970, representing the Agrarian League, in 1965 renamed the Centre Party.

References

1912 births
1994 deaths
People from Urjala
People from Häme Province (Grand Duchy of Finland)
Centre Party (Finland) politicians
Government ministers of Finland
Members of the Parliament of Finland (1948–51)
Members of the Parliament of Finland (1951–54)
Members of the Parliament of Finland (1954–58)
Members of the Parliament of Finland (1958–62)
Members of the Parliament of Finland (1962–66)
Members of the Parliament of Finland (1966–70)